The Levasseur PL.12 was an observation flying boat built by Levasseur in the early 1930s. It was a high-wing monoplane with a monocoque fuselage.

Specifications

References

PL.12
1930s French military reconnaissance aircraft
Aircraft first flown in 1930